The 2011 Australian Open was a tennis tournament featuring six different competitions, and part of the 2011 ATP World Tour, the 2011 WTA Tour, ITF Junior Tour and the NEC Tour, as tournaments for professional, junior and wheelchair players were held. The tournament took place at Melbourne Park in Melbourne, Australia, from 17 January to 30 January, it was the 99th edition of the Australian Open and the first Grand Slam event of 2011. The tournament was played on hard courts and was organised by the International Tennis Federation and Tennis Australia.

Players

Seeds

Qualifiers

Qualifying draw

First qualifier

Second qualifier

Third qualifier

Fourth qualifier

Fifth qualifier

Sixth qualifier

Seventh qualifier

Eighth qualifier

Ninth qualifier

Tenth qualifier

Eleventh qualifier

Twelfth qualifier

References

External links
 2011 Australian Open – Women's draws and results at the International Tennis Federation

Women's Singles Qualifying
Australian Open (tennis) by year – Qualifying